Donald Cochrane may refer to:

 Donald Cochrane (politician) (1904–1985), Australian politician
 Donald Cochrane (economist) (1917–1983), Australian econometrician
 Donald Alexander Cochrane, Canadian composer
 Donald T. Cochrane (1906–1969), Canadian politician in the Legislative Assembly of New Brunswick